Kodalu Diddina Kapuram is a 1970 Indian Telugu-language drama film, produced by N. Trivikrama Rao under the NAT & Ramakrishna Cine Studios banner and directed by D. Yoganand. It stars N. T. Rama Rao, Savitri and Vanisri, with music composed by T. V. Raju. The film was a box office success, and ran for more than 175 days in theatres.

Plot 
Rao Bahadur (Nagabhushanam), a multimillionaire, lives with his wife (Suryakantham), sons Ramu (Jaggayya) and Ranga (N T Rama Rao), daughter Shobha (Sandhya Rani) and son-in-law Shankaram (Padmanabham). Rao Bahadur feels he has earned a lot but later, towards the fag end of his life, realises he has lost his family. His wife is always busy with devotional activities, and, taking it as an advantage, Sachidananda (Satyanarayana), a fake saint, settles in the house. Ramu, the elder son, is a spoiled brat, Married, he leaves his wife Lakshmi (Savitri), irked by her traditional behaviour, and falls into the trap of Maala (Vijayalalitha), a dancer. Ranga, though good-natured, becomes a drunkard due to the situation at home. Shobha, an ultra-modern woman, is always at late-night parties, while her husband Shankara is a puppet in her hands. Even the servants, except for Musalaiah (Tyagaraju), do not care or respect their employer's family members. A short while after Lakshmi enters the house, Ramu asks her for a divorce. She agrees, but requests him to stay with her for sometime as per law. Ranga gets closer to his sister-in-law, and reforms himself under her motherly affection. Ranga & Lakshmi try to set the family right. First, they bring the servants' cheating out into the open, and send Shobha to her in-law's house with Shankaram. Musallaiah's niece Parvathi (Vanisri) joins as a help and Ranga falls in love with her. After Sachidananda is exposed as a huge burglar, Ranga disguises himself as a film director and traps Maala, Ramu realise the virtue of his wife. However, by the time Ramu reaches home, Lakshmi signs the divorce papers and leaves home to commit suicide. Ramu moves in search of her. At the same time, Satchidananda commits a burglary in the house with his aides. Ranga gets them arrested, protects Lakshmi and brings her back. Finally, the entire family is reunited and Ranga & Parvathi get married.

Cast 

N. T. Rama Rao as Ranga
Savitri as Lakshmi
Vanisri as Parvathi
Jaggayya as Ramu
Satyanarayana as Swamiji Sachidananda
Nagabhushanam as Rao Bahadur
Relangi as Cook Siddi
Ramana Reddy as Shankaram's father
V. Nagayya as Lawyer
Dr. Sivaramakrishnaiah as Watchman
Padmanabham as Shankaram
K.V.Chalam as Cook
Raavi Kondala Rao as Cook
Tyagaraju as Musulaiah
Sarathi as Sathu
Suryakantham as Raobahadoor's wife
Santha Kumari as Kanthamma
Vijayalalitha as Mala
Sandhya Rani as Shobha

Soundtrack 

Music composed by T. V. Raju.

Reception 
The film celebrated a Silver Jubilee function and ran more than 175 days in Vijayawada.

Awards
Nandi Award for Second Best Feature Film - Silver - N. Trivikrama Rao (1970)

References

External links 
 

1970 films
1970s Telugu-language films
Films directed by D. Yoganand
Films scored by T. V. Raju
Indian drama films